Idelys Yarie Vázquez (born 21 September 2000) is a Puerto Rican footballer who plays as a forward for college team FIU Panthers and the Puerto Rico women's national team.

Early life
Vázquez was born in Virginia, raised in Virginia Beach to Puerto Rican parents.

High school and college career
Vázquez has attended the First Colonial High School in Virginia Beach, Virginia, Virginia Commonwealth University in Richmond, Virginia and Florida International University in Miami, Florida.

International career
Vázquez represented Puerto Rico at the 2020 CONCACAF Women's U-20 Championship. She made her senior debut on 18 February 2021 in a friendly away match against the Dominican Republic.

International goals
 Scores and results list Puerto Rico's goal tally first, score column indicates score after each Vázquez goal.

References

2000 births
Living people
Puerto Rican women's footballers
Women's association football forwards
Puerto Rico women's international footballers
Sportspeople from Virginia Beach, Virginia
Soccer players from Virginia Beach
American women's soccer players
VCU Rams women's soccer players
FIU Panthers women's soccer players
American sportspeople of Puerto Rican descent